The men's moguls event in freestyle skiing at the 2014 Winter Olympics in Sochi, Russia took place on the 10 February at the Rosa Khutor Extreme Park in Krasnaya Polyana, Sochi.

The defending Olympic is Alexandre Bilodeau, while the defending world champion was Mikaël Kingsbury also of Canada. Bilodeau and Kingsbury took gold and silver, respectively. Alexandr Smyshlyaev of Russia won the bronze medal. Bilodeau became the first freestyle skiing gold medalist to defend his Olympic title, and first repeat gold medalist.

Qualification

An athlete must have placed in the top 30 in at a World Cup event after July 2012 or at the 2013 World Championships and a minimum of 80 FIS points. A total of 30 quota spots were available to athletes to compete at the games. A maximum of 4 athletes could be entered by a National Olympic Committee.

Guilbaut Colas of France withdrew after suffering a knee injury, which reduced the field to 29 athletes.

Results

Qualification
In the first qualifying round, the ten best athletes directly qualify for the final. Others compete in the second qualification round.

Qualifying 1
 QF — Qualified directly for the final
 QS — Qualified for the semifinal
 Bib — Bib number
 DNS — Did not start
 DNF — Did not finish

Qualifying 2

Final
The finals were started at 19:00.

Final 1

Final 2

Final 3

References

Men's freestyle skiing at the 2014 Winter Olympics